Raymond J. Urban was an American football coach. He was the 11th head football coach at Eureka College in Eureka, Illinois, serving for five seasons, from 1969 to 1973, and compiling a record of 14–26–2.

Head coaching record

References

Possibly living people
Year of birth missing
Eureka Red Devils football coaches